High society is a category of people deemed to have social status or prestige.

High Society may also refer to:

Films
 High Society (1924 film), an Our Gang silent comedy
 High Society (1932 film), a comedy film starring Florence Desmond
 High Society (1955 film), a Bowery Boys film
 High Society (1956 film), an MGM musical film
 High Society (2014 film), a French drama film
 High Society (2017 film), a German film of the 2010s
 High Society (2018 film), a South Korean film

Music
 "High Society" (Bear Hands song)
 "High Society" (composition), a 1901 jazz standard written by Porter Steele
 High Society (Enon album)
 High Society (Epik High album)
 High Society (High Contrast album)
 High Society (Kottonmouth Kings album)
 High Society (soundtrack), from the 1956 film
 High Society (The Silver Seas album)

Musicals
 High Society (musical), a 1998 Broadway musical based on the 1956 film
 , a 2004 West End musical based on the 1956 film

Publications
 High Society (comics), a Cerebus the Aardvark story
 High Society (magazine), a U.S. pornographic magazine
 High Society (novel), by Ben Elton

Television
 High Society (1995 TV series), an American sitcom
 High Society (2010 TV series), an American reality show
 High Society (2015 TV series), a South Korean drama series

See also
 Gentry
 Socialite
 Upper class